Schwartz's myotis (Myotis martiniquensis) is a species of vesper bat. It is found in Barbados and Martinique.

References

Mouse-eared bats
Bats of the Caribbean
Mammals of Barbados
Fauna of Martinique
Mammals described in 1973
Vulnerable animals
Taxonomy articles created by Polbot